Nystulia (1–147, 2–148) is a road built as a three-part road network in a residential area of the same name in the village of Ask in the municipality of Gjerdrum in Viken county. The road has access via three intersections from the road Fjellinna, where each branch of Nystulia does not meet in the residential area.

The river Tistilbekken flows partly open and partly in pipes through Nystulia.

The residential area was hit by the 2020 Gjerdrum landslide on the night of 30 December 2020, which is described as the most serious in Norway of this type in recent times.

References

Gjerdrum
Roads in Viken